Digital Bullet is the second solo studio album by American hip hop artist RZA under his pseudonym Bobby Digital. The album was released on August 28, 2001. As a sequel to Bobby Digital in Stereo (1998), the album focuses on an attempt to develop Bobby Digital further, and follows a loose story arc that focused on the character becoming more enlightened and more disillusioned with hedonism as the album progresses. The limited-edition version sold at Best Buy outlets featured two bonus tracks, which were also on the Japanese version of the album released by JVC Records.

Track listing 

Track listing information is taken from the official liner notes and AllMusic.

Notes
 "Glocko Pop" features vocals by Method Man, Masta Killa and Streetlife, not the entire Wu-Tang Clan.
 "Brooklyn Babies" features uncredited singing by Force MDs.
 "Fools" features uncredited vocals by Solomon Childs.
 "Shady" features uncredited vocals by Berretta 9.

Charts

References

Albums produced by Mathematics
Albums produced by True Master
RZA albums
2001 albums
Albums produced by RZA
E1 Music albums
Concept albums
JVC Records albums